Beast from the East is a 1988 live album recorded by Dokken, an American heavy metal band. 

Beast from the East may also refer to:

 The Beast from the East (novel), 1996 book, part of the Goosebumps series
 Nikolai Valuev (born 1973), Russian politician and boxer whose nickname is the Beast from the East
 Bam Bam Bigelow (1961–2007), American professional wrestler whose nickname was the Beast from the East
 Anticyclone Hartmut, the official name for the 2018 Great Britain and Ireland cold wave, nicknamed the "Beast from the East" by the press
 "Beast from the East", the 2018 British Isles cold wave
 "Mini Beast from the East", a shorter period of cold weather that occurred two weeks after the 2018 cold wave
 Storm Darcy (February 2021), nicknamed "Beast from the East 2" by the press

See also
 Beast of the East (disambiguation)